The Mazda 121 name has been used on a variety of Mazda automobiles for various export markets from 1975 until 2002:

 1975–1981 — Piston engined variants of the second generation Mazda Cosmo sports car
 1986–1991 — First generation Ford Festiva subcompact car
 1991–1998 — Autozam Revue subcompact four-door sedan
 1996–2002 — First generation Mazda Demio subcompact car (in countries where the Fiesta-based "121" was not sold)
 1996–2002 — Badge engineered version of the fourth-generation Ford Fiesta subcompact car, sold in some European markets

121
Subcompact cars
Cars introduced in 1975